Cornell Municipal Airport  (formerly 2H3) is a public-use airport located two nautical miles (3.4 km) east of the central business district of Cornell, a city in Chippewa County, Wisconsin, United States.

Facilities and aircraft 
Cornell Municipal Airport covers an area of 143 acres (58 ha) at an elevation of 1154 feet (352 m) above mean sea level. It has a single runway:  9/27 is 2,420 by 45 feet (738 x 14 m) with an asphalt surface.  The airport provides 100LL and Mogas fuel.

For the 12-month period ending September 2, 2010, the airport had 1,810 aircraft operations, an average of 35 per week;  88% transient general aviation, 11% local general aviation and less than 1% military. In January 2023, there were 7 aircraft based at this airport: all 7 single-engine.

See also 
 List of airports in Wisconsin

References

External links 

Airports in Wisconsin
Buildings and structures in Chippewa County, Wisconsin